In the mathematical field of graph theory, the distance between two vertices in a graph is the number of edges in a shortest path (also called a graph geodesic) connecting them.  This is also known as the geodesic distance or shortest-path distance. Notice that there may be more than one shortest path between two vertices. If there is no path connecting the two vertices, i.e., if they belong to different connected components, then conventionally the distance is defined as infinite.

Notice that, in contrast with the case of undirected graphs,  does not necessarily coincide with —so it is just a quasi-metric, and it might be the case that one is defined while the other is not.

Related concepts
A metric space defined over a set of points in terms of distances in a graph defined over the set is called a graph metric.
The vertex set (of an undirected graph) and the distance function form a metric space, if and only if the graph is connected.

It can be thought of as how far a node is from the node most distant from it in the graph.

The radius  of a graph is the minimum eccentricity of any vertex or, in symbols, 

The diameter  of a graph is the maximum eccentricity of any vertex in the graph.  That is,  is the greatest distance between any pair of vertices or, alternatively, 

To find the diameter of a graph, first find the shortest path between each pair of vertices. The greatest length of any of these paths is the diameter of the graph. 

A central vertex in a graph of radius  is one whose eccentricity is —that is, a vertex whose distance from its furthest vertex is equal to the radius, equivalently, a vertex  such that .

A peripheral vertex in a graph of diameter  is one whose eccentricity is —that is, a vertex whose distance from its furthest vertex is equal to the diameter. Formally,  is peripheral if .

A level structure of the graph, given a starting vertex, is a partition of the graph's vertices into subsets by their distances from the starting vertex.

A geodetic graph is one for which every pair of vertices has a unique shortest path connecting them. For example, all trees are geodetic.

The weighted shortest-path distance generalises the geodesic distance to weighted graphs. See the shortest path problem for more details and algorithms.

Algorithm for finding pseudo-peripheral vertices
Often peripheral sparse matrix algorithms need a starting vertex with a high eccentricity. A peripheral vertex would be perfect, but is often hard to calculate. In most circumstances a pseudo-peripheral vertex can be used.  A pseudo-peripheral vertex can easily be found with the following algorithm:

 Choose a vertex .
 If  then set  and repeat with step 2, else  is a pseudo-peripheral vertex.

See also

 Distance matrix
 Resistance distance
 Betweenness centrality
 Centrality
 Closeness
 Degree diameter problem for graphs and digraphs
 Metric graph

Notes

Graph theory
Metric geometry